Balewadi is a village in the Karmala taluka of Solapur district in Maharashtra state, India.

Demographics
Covering  and comprising 214 households at the time of the 2011 census of India, Balewadi had a population of 982. There were 531 males and 451 females, with 97 people being aged six or younger.

References

Villages in Karmala taluka